Jonas Deichmann, born 15 April 1987 in Stuttgart, is a German adventurer, extreme athlete, and holder of multiple world records in cycling and endurance. Jonas has completed a triathlon around the world covering a distance of 120 long-distance triathlons (approximately 456 km of swimming, 21600 km of cycling and 5064 km running). During this journey, he gained international notoriety as the "German Forrest Gump". The book about his journey "Das Limit bin nur ich" is a bestseller. Prior to his triathlon around the world, he set multiple cycling records from Norway to South Africa, Alaska to Argentina, and across Eurasia.

Early life
Jonas Deichmann was born on 15 April 1987 in Stuttgart, a city in the German state of Baden-Württemberg. During his childhood the family moved to the Black Forest where he grew up in Grunbach and Pforzheim and attended . After high school he studied International Business in Sweden, Brazil, Singapore, Denmark and India. He completed a BSc in Business Administration and Economics at Jönköping International Business School in 2012 followed by a Masters degree from Copenhagen Business School in 2014. After university he returned to Germany and worked as a sales manager for a Swedish software company in Munich.

Sports

Cabo da Roca, Portugal to Vladivostok, Russia 

In summer 2017 he cycled the 14331 km long route from Cabo da Roca in Portugal to Vladivostok in Russia in 64 days, 2 hours and 25 minutes setting a new world record for the fastest cycling across Eurasia. During the journey he also set a new world record for the fastest cycling across Europe from Cabo da Roca to Ufa in Russia in 25 days, 3 hours and 38 minutes.

Prudhoe Bay, Alaska to Ushuaia, Argentina 
From the 19 August 2018 to 24 November 2018 he cycled the 23112 km long Panamericana from Prudhoe Bay, Alaska to Ushuaia, Argentina in a new record time of 97 days. He completed his journey unsupported with the help of a team or support vehicle.

Capenorth, Norway to Cape Town, South Africa 
From 8 September to 19 November he completed the approximately 18000 km long journey from North Cape in Norway to Cape Town in South Africa on his bicycle in a new record time of 72 days, 7 hours and 27 minutes. He was 30 days faster than the prior record holder.

Triathlon around Germany 
On 23 August 2020 he completed a triathlon around Germany, covering a distance of 16-times Ironman. He started in Lindau at Lake Constance and swam 60 km across the lake. He then cycled clockwise around Germany until the town of Zwiesel in Bavaria and the ran the final 675 km back to Lindau where he arrived after 31 days. The journey was a training and test for a triathlon around the world („Triathlon 360-degree") to which Deichmann started on 26 September 2020 in Munich.

Across the Alps to Karlobag, Croatia 
He first cycled across the Alps to Karlobag in Croatia and then swam 456 km along the coast to Dubrovnik in 54 days. He completed the swim without a support boat and pulled a self designed raft with his supplies. He beat the prior record for the longest swim without a support by Sean Conway who had swam 200 km along the British coast.

Dubrovnik to Vladivostok 
From Dubrovnik he cycled to Vladivostok on the Russian Pacific after his original route further South was closed due to the COVID-19 pandemic. In Siberia he faced temperatures below −30 °C and reached the Pacific in May.

North America 

For the running section he changed plans again since the US and Canada had closed their borders. Instead he ran across Mexico from Tijuana in Baja California to Cancun in Quintana Roo. He completed the 5064 km long route in 117 days, covering more than one marathon a day.

During his running he become nationally known as the „German Forrest Gump" and was partly followed by police escort, media live coverage and people from Mexico who joined his run. From Cancun he flew to Lisbon in Portugal and cycled back to Munich.

After 429 days, he completed his around the world journey on 29 November 2021. The distance was approximately 120 long-distance triathlons. After the journey, he appeared in talkshows, published a book „Das Limit bin nur ich" (in German) and a documentary film with the same name.

Filmography
 Das Limit bin nur ich (2021). Ravir Film.
 Cape to Cape (2020). Cycled Media.

Books
 Der Schokoriegel Effekt – mit einfachen Mitteln große Ziele erreichen (2023). Gräfe und Unzer Verlag. 
 Das Limit bin nur ich – Der Bildband (2022). Polyglott Verlag. 
 Das Limit bin nur ich: Wie ich als erster Mensch die Welt im Triathlon umrundete (2021). Polyglott Verlag. 
 Cape to Cape: In Rekordzeit mit dem Fahrrad vom Nordkap bis nach Südafrika (2020). Delius Klasing Verlag.

External links

References 

1987 births
Living people
Copenhagen Business School alumni
German explorers
German non-fiction writers
German male non-fiction writers
Motivational speakers
Hikers
Survivalists
Discovery Channel people